The Felten's myotis (Myotis punicus) is a species of vesper bat.

Distribution
It is found in Algeria, Libya, Malta, Morocco, Tunisia, France (Corsica) and Italy (Sardinia). Its natural habitats are temperate forests, temperate shrubland, subtropical or tropical dry shrubland, Mediterranean-type shrubby vegetation, temperate grassland, caves, subterranean habitats (other than caves), arable land, rural gardens, and irrigated land. The habitat range extends to the border of the Sahara desert. In Tunisia, the species has been observed as far south as Ghomrassen or the Bou-Hedma National Park.

Distinctive early spring birth
The species - at least as far as specimens roosting in Northern Tunisia are concerned - seems able to give birth much earlier in the spring than the closely related species Myotis myotis or M. blythii in Europe or Western Asia: Individuals born that year and able to fly were observed in el Haouariya caves on May 24th 2011 (i.e. these juveniles were born between 3 and 4 weeks prior).

References

Mouse-eared bats
Taxonomy articles created by Polbot
Mammals described in 1977
Bats of Europe
Bats of Africa